George Oliver (3 April 1891 – 21 July 1977) was a Welsh dual-code international rugby union and professional rugby league footballer who played in the 1910s and 1920s.

Background 
George Oliver was born in Pontypool, Wales, and he died aged 86 in Pontypool, Wales.

Playing career

International honours
George Oliver won 4 caps for Wales (RU) in 1921–1927 while at Pontypool RFC in 1920 against England, Scotland, France, and Ireland, and won caps for Wales (RL) while at Hull, and Pontypridd.

County honours
George Oliver  played right-, i.e. number 10, in Monmouthshire's 14–18 defeat by Glamorgan in the non-County Championship match during the 1926–27 season at Taff Vale Park, Pontypridd on Saturday 30 April 1927.

Challenge Cup Final appearances
George Oliver played  in Hull FC's 9-10 defeat by Rochdale Hornets in the 1922 Challenge Cup Final during the 1921–22 season at Headingley Rugby Stadium, Leeds, in front of a crowd of 34,827.

References

External links
 (archived by web.archive.org) Stats – PastPlayers – O at hullfc.com
 (archived by web.archive.org) Statistics at hullfc.com

1891 births
1977 deaths
Dual-code rugby internationals
Hull F.C. players
Monmouthshire rugby league team players
Pill Harriers RFC players
Pontypool RFC players
Rugby league hookers
Rugby league players from Pontypool
Rugby league props
Rugby union locks
Rugby union players from Pontypool
Talywain RFC players
Wales international rugby union players
Wales national rugby league team players
Welsh rugby league players
Welsh rugby union players